This is a list of broadcast television stations that are licensed in the U.S. state of Georgia.

Full-power stations
VC refers to the station's PSIP virtual channel. RF refers to the station's physical RF channel.

Defunct full-power stations
Channel 9: WROM-TV - NBC/CBS/ABC/DuMont - Rome (3/15/53-12/1957)
Channel 26: WAGT - NBC - Augusta (1968-1970, 1974-2017)
Channel 36: WQXI-TV - Atlanta (10/13/1954-5/31/1955)
Channel 36: WATL-TV (original) - Atlanta (8/16/1969-3/30/1971)
Channel 44: WVGA - ABC - Valdosta (12/24/1980-11/6/1992)
Channel 47: WETV, WNEX-TV, WOKA - Macon (8/25/1953-5/31/1955)

LPTV stations

Translators

See also
 Georgia media
 List of newspapers in Georgia (U.S. state)
 List of radio stations in Georgia (U.S. state)
 Media of cities in Georgia: Athens, Atlanta, Augusta, Columbus, Macon, Savannah
 Georgia Association of Broadcasters
 List of Spanish-language television networks in the United States

Bibliography

External links
 
 
  (Directory ceased in 2016

Georgia

Television Stations